GAIL D.A.V. Public School is an English medium co-educational senior secondary school established in 1997 situated at Gail Gaon, Dibiyapur, Auraiya, Uttar Pradesh, India. This school is supported by GAIL (India) Ltd. PATA, one of Maharatna Public Sector Units of Govt. of India.

History
The school is directly managed by the DAV CMC, New Delhi and financially supported by GAIL (India) Ltd.

Academics
GAIL D.A.V. Public School, Gail Gaon is affiliated with the Central Board of Secondary Education (CBSE), which is the largest educational board in the country.

See also

 Arya Samaj
Dayanand Anglo-Vedic Schools System

External links 
Official Website
D.A.V. at Antya

Primary schools in Uttar Pradesh
High schools and secondary schools in Uttar Pradesh
Schools affiliated with the Arya Samaj
Dibiyapur
Educational institutions established in 1997
1997 establishments in Uttar Pradesh